Cropwell Butler is a village and civil parish in the borough of Rushcliffe in Nottinghamshire, United Kingdom, one mile east of the A46, under the NG12 postcode. It shares a parish council with Tithby and is adjacent to the south to Cropwell Bishop.

Location and governance
The civil parish population recorded in the 2011 Census was 585. Some of the newly built Upper Saxondale residential area also falls within the parish boundary.

Cropwell Butler shares with Tithby a parish council that meets once a month. The village forms part of the Cropwell Ward of the Borough of Rushcliffe and of the Parliamentary Constituency of Rushcliffe, whose current member is the Conservative Ruth Edwards. The county authority is Nottinghamshire.

Historical events
A post windmill at Cropwell Butler was blown down in 1837. The miller escaped, but with severe bruising, by hiding in a hollow place under a beam.

During the Second World War, German bombers left a trail of devastation across the Nottingham area on the night of 8–9 May 1941, when 95 aircraft attacked the city at 12.37 am. Among the documents now held at the Notts Archives Offices is a detailed map of the city showing the sites the Germans intended to target, which included a gas works, electricity plants, railways, the Royal Ordnance Factory, Raleigh and some chemical factories. In reality, some of the Luftwaffe crews were deflected by a Starfish site at Cropwell Butler – waste land deliberately set alight to lure them away from key targets. So some of them bombed the Vale of Belvoir by mistake, thinking it was Nottingham and killing only livestock.

Amenities
The village has a pub, The Plough Inn in Main Street, which also serves meals. This and the Village Hall and Sheldon Field are the only remaining public facilities in what is a small and quiet village. The post office and the few independent shops fell to a housing development, Carpenters Close, in the late 1970s and early 1980s.

There is neither a school nor an Anglican church in the village. The Methodist chapel has regular services on the first, third and fourth Sundays of each month.

Transport
Cropwell Butler has hourly daytime buses on weekdays to Nottingham (No. 33, CT4N) and to Bingham (No. 833. Vectare). The nearest railway stations are Radcliffe (2.6 miles, 4.2 km) and Bingham (3.4 miles, 5.5 km), both on the Nottingham–Grantham–Skegness line.

Sports
The Sheldon Field provides the pitch for a number of football teams in the East Midlands Public Authorities Amateur League (EMPAL). Both Butler-Benfica FC (Cropwell Butler) and Chequers Rangers United (Cropwell Bishop) play at the Sheldon Field on Sunday mornings.

References

Villages in Nottinghamshire
Rushcliffe